Smite is a 2014 free-to-play, third-person multiplayer online battle arena (MOBA) video game developed and published by Hi-Rez Studios for Microsoft Windows, Xbox One, PlayStation 4, and Nintendo Switch, and Amazon Luna. In Smite, players control a god, goddess or other mythological figure and take part in team-based combat, using their abilities and tactics against other player-controlled gods and non-player-controlled minions.

The game has multiple player versus player (PVP) modes, many playable characters, and has a successful esports scene with multiple tournaments, including the annual million-dollar Smite World Championship.

Gameplay 
Smite features many different game modes with the largest being Conquest. Players can choose between Training (vs AI), Custom, Co-Op (with clan/friends), Normal and Ranked play styles. From there, they can choose between a variety of standard game modes. Special event games with unique rules like unlimited gold are also often introduced.

With every game, players have to choose a god or other figure to play as. Currently, players can choose between a large variety of characters from different pantheons including, but not limited to, Babylonian, Celtic, Chinese, Egyptian, Greek, Hindu, Japanese, Norse, Polynesian, Slavic and Yoruba. The characters of King Arthur's legends (referred to as the Arthurian pantheon in-game) and the Cthulhu Mythos (referred to as the pantheon of the Great Old Ones) are also considered pantheons in this video game.

Each character is classified as one of the following classes: Assassin, Guardian, Hunter, Mage, or Warrior. Unless otherwise stated, two players on the same team cannot choose the same character (in competitive modes and those using a Draft pick method, each player must use a different character). Successful team configurations are typically based on standard RPG raid configurations (tank, healer, physical/magical damage) during god selection.

The player controls the god in a third-person perspective which is a unique characteristic of this MOBA, as other games of this genre are typically played from a top-down perspective. Each god has a basic attack, a passive trait and four abilities with varying effects, such as area damage, crowd control, buffs and many more. These abilities are acquired and upgraded when the player's character levels up by gaining experience from being in range of minions when they are killed, taking down towers or phoenixes and defeating enemy characters. The maximum level is 20 and each successive level is more difficult to reach. Gold (used to buy items that increase power, defense and passive effects, potions, wards and abilities) is accumulated through standard periodic income, by slaying enemies (player and NPC alike) or selling owned items.

The large areas between the lanes make up what is called the "jungle", where computer-controlled monsters such as packs of cyclopes or Furies (the latter alternately referred to as harpies) periodically spawn at specific locations distributed symmetrically across the map. Killing certain monsters in said jungle causes a "buff" to drop on the ground where it can be picked up by a player, which depending on the type of monster killed will grant the player bonuses to stats such as damage dealt, movement speed, attack speed. There are three special neutral monsters who appear less frequently that when killed will grant the entire team who killed it a powerful damage buff for a medium length of time, set amount of Gold, and a speed boost when coming out of the base respectively. There are also some monsters which do not offer a buff, only experience and gold.

Conquest 
Conquest is the default game mode for any MOBA like Smite or League of Legends. It's a three-lane map based on Warcraft IIIs Defense of the Ancients map.

In Conquest, players are formed into two teams with five players on each team. All players begin at opposite sides of a map at their team's "fountain". Before the players enter the map, they are granted an amount of gold to buy starting items. These items grant special bonuses or abilities that enhance the player's god. There are three continuous "lanes" running from one side of the map to the other. Each lane is defended by a "Phoenix" which is accompanied by a pair of extra defensive towers. Phoenixes and towers deal a large amount of damage to any enemies that come too close.

The goal of each game is to destroy the opposing team's Phoenixes and the Titan, a giant warrior who must be defeated to win the game. The players are accompanied by "minions", small soldiers with a weak attack. These minions spawn at the Phoenixes every thirty seconds and run along their lane until they meet opposition and attack immediately. Archers will attack not only players and other minions but also towers, Phoenixes and the Titan. In fact, their presence is required for players to deal full damage to these objectives. Defensive positions will prioritize enemy minions over players, allowing players to attack a tower without receiving damage.

Towers will fire upon players if there are no minions nearby or the player attacks an enemy player under their tower. If a game is going badly for a certain team they can decide to surrender after at least 10 minutes, though this requires a majority of the team (4 players to 1) to agree. In the event of players dropping, two players on either team can choose to pause the game for 30 seconds to wait. If a team is down by one or more players, they can surrender within 6 minutes.

Joust 
Joust is similar to Conquest, except each team has only three players and the map has only one lane with a jungle on each side. Players also start at level 3, due to the smaller map size and increased combat. There is a jungle boss called Bull Demon King in the side lane that renders the opposing team's tower or phoenix unable to attack enemy minions or players. This boss also provides a team buff that gives both health and mana regeneration. Teams have one tower, one phoenix and a titan each.

Slash 
Slash resembles both Joust and Conquest, except it has two lanes with five players on each team. Each team has their own respective jungle, while three contested jungles are located in the centre (left, right and mid). Players start at level three and the middle jungle gets stronger as the match goes on, eventually spawning the boss Apophis. There are additional jungle bosses across the map that, if killed, spawn siege juggernauts, which can destroy towers and kill players and minions. Teams have two towers, two phoenixes and a titan each.

The name Slash is a portmanteau of the two discontinued game modes that it is based on - Siege and Clash. Slash replaced these two modes in 2022.

Assault 
Assault is a one-lane fight with random gods assigned to each player. Each team has five players, and there are various health orbs scattered upon the map. Teams have two towers, one phoenix and a titan each. There are no jungle camps and the only goal is to push the minion waves forwards and destroy all of the enemy structures, with the game ending at the death of a Titan. Additionally, once a player has left the fountain, they cannot return to base to buy items or regenerate their health until they die.

Arena 
Arena has no towers nor titans and the phoenixes can not be attacked (they instead defend team bases). Each team has five players in an open colosseum-like arena. There are three jungle camps on each side of the map (left and right) and a single stream of minions running to the opposing team's portal. Each time a minion is killed or enters a portal, one point is deducted from the enemy team's total. Each time a god is killed, 5 points are taken from the enemy team's total.
Teams can also spawn minotaurs after collectively killing 10 enemy gods, which give big point boosts if they survive long enough to reach the enemy portal (15 points are taken from the enemy team's total). Points start at 500 for each team and go down until one team reaches 0 and loses.

Passive gold income is greatly increased for this game mode and the spawn timers are greatly decreased. Each god starts at level 3 and has more starting gold than other game modes.

Matchmaking 
The matchmaking system uses a modified version of the TrueSkill ranking system. Around December 2013, there was a feature added that allowed players to choose between US and EU servers, but was later removed from the game due to issues with the matchmaking system. This feature was eventually re-added. Originally, most modes used to operate on queues with 3-minute matchmaking timers. Every three minutes, matches would be made from the group of people in queue at that time. In late 2014, that system was replaced with a more traditional non-timed one (a more popular format in many MOBAs) that looks for an optimal match instead of just the best match-ups at the present time. In this system, if it takes 5 minutes or more to match a player, the game will gradually lower its requirements until a match is found. A new matchmaking system similar to the original one was introduced in 2018, with different times for different modes. The system will prioritize the player's general performance over their account level.

In Ranked Leagues, players are matched by a variation of Elo, a system that rates players with a number that indicates how well the individual skill of that player is. The player will be matched with players that have a similar rating as them. The goal of this system is to have 2 individual teams that have a similar TOTAL Elo. Ranked mode is available for Conquest and Joust.

Release 
Smite was made available to the public for the first time on May 31, 2012, with its closed beta, transitioning into open beta on January 24, 2013. The game was officially released on March 25, 2014.  Around that time, Smite reached 3 million players and later 4 million players in June that same year. In 2015, more than 10 million players have played Smite. In June 2016, Hi-Rez Studios announced the game attracted 20 million players. In 2019, the game surpassed 30 million players and generated 300 million dollars. In April 2020, Hi-Rez reported that the game had over 40 million players.

International expansion 
On August 21, 2013, Hi-Rez Studios partnered themselves with Tencent, an online media company that publishes video games in China. On June 5, 2014, Hi-Rez Studios announced they partnered with Level Up! Games to bring the game to the Latin American region. In October 2014, Oceanic servers were added and in August 2016 southeast Asian servers were added. In October 2017, the Chinese client was announced to be merged with the international client, with migration taking place late November.

Esports 
In mid-2014, Hi-Rez Studios implemented a system by which players could join professional leagues in teams of 5. Players first played in online competitions, then progressed to offline competitions. Next, the teams were ranked according to how well they did within these competitions, and finally, the top teams were invited to compete in the Smite World Championship. From January 9–11, 2015, Hi-Rez Studios hosted the first Smite World Championship. Teams from North America, South America, Europe and China travelled to Atlanta for the tournament. The $2.6 million prize pool for the tournament was at the time the third-highest in esports, behind the third and fourth iterations of Dota 2s The International and just slightly ahead of the League of Legends World Championships. One of the North American teams, COGnitive Prime, took home the first place prize with a little over $1.3 million.

In July 2015, Stew Chisam, president of Hi-Rez Studios, announced that after discussing the prizing structure of Smite esports with team owners, players and members of other esports communities, Hi-Rez would be placing a cap on the prize pool for the Smite World Championships at $1 million. This decision was based to pay out more money to more players throughout the year instead of paying the bulk of earned prize money at a single event.

In January 2016, the Smite World Championship was held, returning to Atlanta, with the total prize of $1 million awarded.

Business model 
Smite is a freemium game that is free to play but has in-game purchases for player skins, boost and more. It has two in-game currencies – gems and favor. Each has a different value and can be used to purchase different in-game items.

Gods in the free version are available on a monthly rotating basis, with only a dozen playable gods available at any given time. Players can pay to unlock gods, bonus skins, emotes, character taunts/dances, and access to Odyssey and Battle Pass quests.Many of these skins are limited editions and related to special events (i.e. E3 Tyr skin given only to 2015 convention attendees).

During its beta phase in 2013, the company sold lifetime passes for $59.99 to unlock all future gods. There are currently over 115 selectable gods in five classes: Assassin, Warrior, Guardian, Mage and Hunter.

Many skins represent brand partnerships including Monstercat, RWBY, Teenage Mutant Ninja Turtles, Bob Ross, Stranger Things, Avatar: the Last Airbender, Transformers, Slipknot and Nickelodeon. As of 2019, the game generated $300 million in revenue for Hi-Rez Studios and created over 450 jobs.

Reception 

Smite received generally favorable reviews from critics. The game currently holds a score of 83 out of 100 on Metacritic, based on a dozen reviews by major video game critics.

Leah B. Jackson of IGN rated the game 8/10 and wrote that she was delighted with the wide variety of different gods and the detailed models, indicating "A new perspective on familiar game design can make everything feel fresh, and Smite doesn't stop there". Wes Fenlon from PCGamer rated the game 86/100, criticizing the low entry barriers for ranked games and emphasizes Smites moderate willingness to provide new players with an easy entry into the MOBA genre. Keith Milburn from NZGamer reports some IA issues on the PlayStation 4 version that made the game less fluid. He praises the mixture of elements in Smite with PvE to create a pleasant chaos, which scores with MMO-like elements. Paulmichael Contreras from PlayStation Life Style describes the free-to-play model from Smite as a fair system without falling into the area of "pay-to-win". Champions that can be bought extra fit well into the game balance without being clearly better than others, especially since paying for game content is just an additional option. Implementation on the various platforms is also highlighted. GamesRadar+ listed in their top "Free PS4 games: The best titles you can download without paying a thing", saying "With a current line-up of 93 playable hero deities covering ranged and melee archetypes (with separate magical and physical combat types), spread over five distinct classes, there's a huge amount of tactical team play to get stuck into. The free-to-play model is pretty damn pleasant, too". Digital Trends listed Smite in their top "The best free-to-play games for 2020", indicating that "Smite has been a mainstay in the MOBA genre since 2014. It stands out for its third-person presentation, differentiating itself from League, Heroes of the Storm, and Dota 2". CulturedVultures ranked Smite fourth in their list of the top "20 Best Free Games On Steam". TheGamer listed the game 7th in their top 10 "Free-to-Play Switch Games Actually Worth the Grind".

Controversy 
In June 2012, some Hindu leaders became upset at the inclusion of several Hindu gods in Smite and the fact that they are player-controlled. The deities that were in question were Kali, Agni and Vamana (the only playable Hindu deities at the time) and there was particular opposition to how Kali was dressed. Rajan Zed, the president of Universal Society of Hinduism, released a statement urging Hi-Rez to remove these gods from the game, claiming their presence is trivialized and in other words, offensive to the devoted. Since players control the gods, this is seen as offensive to the faithful.

In response Todd Harris, CEO of Hi-Rez, said:

Despite the response from Hi-Rez, in early July 2012, the Hindu leader who spoke out against the game had not given up on his quest to rid Smite of Hindu deities and since his initial statement he has gained new backers from other faiths that have come together in support of his stance that the game's content is offensive. Rajin Zed was joined by Rabbi Elizabeth Beyer and Buddhist Jikai Phil Bryan in condemning the game's content as offensive. These leaders have labelled the old Kali model as being depicted in a "pornographic style," which appeared to be their main concern. The Kali character went under a major art and gameplay overhaul in December 2013, which included more concealing armour. Despite the protests, Hi-Rez has continued to expand the Hindu Pantheon roster, with its most recent addition being Shiva.

Accolades

References

External links 

Crossover video games
2014 video games
Action video games
BAFTA winners (video games)
Cthulhu Mythos video games
Cultural depictions of Gilgamesh
Esports games
Fiction about Voodoo
Free-to-play video games
Hinduism in pop culture-related controversies
Mesoamerican mythology in popular culture
Mesopotamian mythology in popular culture
Multiplayer online battle arena games
Multiplayer video games
Nintendo Switch games
PlayStation 4 games
PlayStation 4 Pro enhanced games
 
Unreal Engine games
Video game controversies
Video games adapted into comics
Video games based on Arthurian legend
Video games based on Celtic mythology
Video games based on Chinese mythology
Video games based on classical mythology
Video games based on Egyptian mythology
Video games based on Greek mythology
Video games based on Hindu mythology
Video games based on Japanese mythology
Video games based on multiple mythologies
Video games based on Norse mythology
Video games based on Slavic mythology
Video games containing battle passes
Video games developed in the United States
Video games set in antiquity
Windows games
Works based on Investiture of the Gods
Xbox One games
Xbox One X enhanced games
Level Up! Games games